Mohiuddin Ahmed (31 January 1944 – 20 June 2022) was a Bangladeshi diplomat, the first in Europe to join the Bangladesh Liberation War while he was a second secretary at the High Commission of Pakistan in London. During his career, he served in different positions at Bangladesh Missions in Delhi, Geneva, Jakarta, Jeddah, and New York, and as a Secretary in the Ministry of Foreign Affairs and Principal, Foreign Service Academy. In 1997, he declined two years' ante-dated seniority given to freedom fighter officers. He was also a columnist and has written about 1500 columns in mainstream dailies and weeklies in Bangladesh.

Early life 
Mohiuddin Ahmed was born in 1944 in Feni district of Bangladesh and attended G. M. Hat High School, founded by his father Abdur Rashid Master. He later pursued his Master's degree in economics at Karachi University. Ahmed's mother, Arfaner Nesa, had received the 'Ratnagarva Ma' Award (Bengali: রত্নগর্ভা মা পুরস্কার, English: Mothers of talents Award) in 2004 - an award initiated to honor successful mothers of at least 3 children who had established themselves in life by their own talents and achievements.

Role in Bangladesh Liberation War 1971 
At the age of 27, Mohiuddin Ahmed, was a second secretary at the Pakistan High Commission of London. He caused a media stir in the United Kingdom when on 1 August 1971 he had resigned his position and expressed allegiance to the Provisional Government of Bangladesh in Kolkata.

Ahmed had wanted to give his resignation earlier, on 10 April, but was advised by Justice Abu Sayeed Chowdhury to wait. Immediately after his resignation he spent time with his pregnant wife and awaited instructions.

The next morning the Pakistan High Commission had called Ahmed and asked him to rejoin them. He strongly declined and after two hours Ahmed was asked to return his diplomatic passport as well as that of his wife's. Once he left the Pakistan High Commission, he did not hold diplomatic status anymore because Bangladesh was not recognized as an independent country then. For a short time after that, Ahmed and his Bengali colleagues were men without a country.

From the end of August '71, a Bangladeshi Mission was opened in London, and it welcomed Bengali diplomats who had left the Pakistani Foreign Service around the world. Diplomats were advised to resign by 7 October and join in London or Kolkata. Their most important task then was to get recognition for Bangladesh from the UK. After an extensive awareness raising campaign about the atrocities committed by the Pakistani military during the Liberation War, in February '72, the UK formally recognized Bangladesh as an independent nation, two months after the war ended.

The protest rally at Trafalgar Square in August 1971, where Ahmed had declared his allegiance to Bangladesh, is said to be the biggest gathering of Bangladeshis to date. At the rally which was under the banner "Stop Genocide: Recognize Bangladesh", Ahmed delivered a riveting speech to tell people around the world why Bangladesh was waging war to be free. Under the guidance of Justice Chowdhury, Ahmed had played a crucial role in galvanizing the expatriate Bengali community in UK. Ahmed's defection was quickly followed by the same from Mohammed Akbar Lutful Matin on 4 August, Abdur Rouf and Fazlul Haq Chowdhury in September. Ahmed was also at Heathrow Airport to receive Bangabandhu Sheikh Mujibur Rahman on 8 January 1972, when the father of the nation transited through London to independent Bangladesh after his release from Pakistan's prison.

Statement at the 68th Regular Session of the UNGA 
Ahmed made a statement on nuclear disarmament at the General Debate of the First Committee of the 68th Regular Session of the United Nations General Assembly (UNGA) on 10 October 2013.

Death 
Ahmed died on 20 June 2022 in Uttara, Dhaka, Bangladesh.

References 

1944 births
2022 deaths
Bangladeshi diplomats
People from Feni District
University of Karachi alumni